Julia Glushko and Rebecca Peterson were the defending champions, but Glushko chose not to participate. Peterson partnered Sanaz Marand, but they lost in the first round.

Ingrid Neel and Taylor Townsend won the title, defeating Samantha Crawford and Melanie Oudin in the final, 6–4, 6–3.

Seeds

Draw

References 
 Draw

CopperWynd Pro Women's Challenge - Doubles